Ołobok may refer to the following places in Poland:
Ołobok, Lower Silesian Voivodeship (south-west Poland)
Ołobok, Greater Poland Voivodeship (west-central Poland)
Ołobok, Lubusz Voivodeship (west Poland)